Radeh-ye Seyhan (also Romanized as Radeh-ye Seyḩān; also known as Beyt-e Seyḩān, Radeh-ye Sobhān, Seyḩān, and Seyjān) is a village in Bahmanshir-e Jonubi Rural District, in the Central District of Abadan County, Khuzestan Province, Iran. At the 2006 census, its population was 537, in 92 families.

References 

Populated places in Abadan County